Stephen Doyle is an Irish sportsman.  He plays hurling for Wexford and his club, Oulart–The Ballagh.

References

Year of birth missing (living people)
Living people
Wexford inter-county hurlers
Oulart-the-Ballagh hurlers